Greg Stevens may refer to:

Greg Stevens (Alberta politician) (born 1935), Canadian politician
Greg Stevens (Iowa politician) (born 1960), American politician
Greg Stevens (writer), Australian television writer